Last of the Sharpshooters is an album by Down by Law. It was released by Epitaph in 1997.

It received mostly positive reviews.

Track listing
 "USA Today"
 "No Equalizer"
 "Call To Arms"
 "Guns Of '96"
 "Get Out"
 "Burning Heart"
 "Question Marks & Periods"
 "Urban Napalm"
 "D.J.G."
 "Concrete Times"
 "No One Gets Away"
 "The Last Goodbye"
 "Factory Day"
 "The Cool Crowd"
 "Self-Destruction"

References

Down by Law (band) albums
1997 albums
Epitaph Records albums